Bouquet is the debut extended play (EP) by American DJ duo The Chainsmokers. It was released on October 23, 2015, through Disruptor Records and Columbia Records.

Critical reception

Track listing

Charts

Weekly charts

Year-end charts

Certifications

References

2015 debut EPs
The Chainsmokers albums
Dance music EPs